Boyens is a surname. Notable people with the surname include:

 Andrew Boyens (born 1983), New Zealand footballer
 Philippa Boyens (born 1962), New Zealand screenwriter and producer

See also
 Boeyens, a surname
 Boyen (disambiguation)